Daisy May Head (born 7 March 1991) is an English actress. She played Grace in the American drama series Guilt, Amy Stevenson in BBC One's drama The Syndicate, Kate Bottomley in the third season of Hulu series Harlots and Genya Safin in the Netflix show Shadow and Bone.

Early life and education
Head was born in Fulham, London. She is the daughter of actor Anthony Head and younger sister of actress Emily Head. Daisy attended Kingswood School in Bath and trained at the Dorothy Coleborn School of Dance.

Career
Head's first role was appearing alongside her father in the TV series Rose and Maloney. She has subsequently appeared in a number of TV programmes, including Trial and Retribution, Doc Martin and Holby City.

In 2010, she made her film debut in playing Chloe Chambers in The Last Seven, alongside Danny Dyer and later that year she played Daisy in CBBC's musical film Rules of Love alongside future Rixton frontman Jake Roche.

In 2016, she starred as Arriane Alter in the British/Australian/American romantic fantasy film Fallen as well as in the new Underworld film Underworld: Blood Wars as Alexia.

In November 2015, it was announced that Head would take the lead role of Grace in Freeform's drama series Guilt about an American student in London whose roommate is murdered. The series concluded after 10 episodes.

In 2017, Head starred in the Shakespearean Pilot A Midsummer's Nightmare alongside Casey Deidrick.

In 2018 Head had a supporting role in Kay Mellor's ITV drama Girlfriends which started airing in January 2018. In May 2017 it was announced that she would be starring alongside Daisy Ridley in 2018 film Ophelia.

Head joined the cast of Harlots as Kate Bottomley in the Hulu series' third season in 2019. In October 2019, it was announced Head would play Genya Safin in the 2021 Netflix series Shadow and Bone, an adaptation of fantasy book series Shadow and Bone and Six of Crows by Leigh Bardugo.

Filmography

Film

Television

References

External links

Living people
1991 births
21st-century English actresses
Actresses from London
English film actresses
English television actresses
People educated at Kingswood School, Bath
People from Fulham